37th Army may refer to:
 37th Army (Japan)
 37th Army (Soviet Union)